Tetrops hauseri is a species of beetle in the family Cerambycidae. It was described by Reitter in 1897. It is known from Kazakhstan and China.

Subspecies
 Tetrops hauseri kostini Özdikmen & Turgut, 2008
 Tetrops hauseri hauseri Reitter, 1897

References

Tetropini
Beetles described in 1897